This is a list of crime films released in 2001.

References

2000s
2001-related lists